The thirteenth series of the Australian cooking game show MasterChef Australia premiered on 19 April 2021 on Network 10. Andy Allen, Melissa Leong, and Jock Zonfrillo returned to the show as judges from the previous season.

Applications for contestants for the 13th series of MasterChef Australia were open between April and August 2020.

Changes
Only three Immunity Pins were up for grabs this season, which all 24 contestants competed for during the first Mystery Box challenge. In addition to being exempt from the first Elimination Challenge, the holders of the Immunity Pins were able to use them at any point during future Elimination Challenges, including right up to the end of a challenge.

The Second Chance Challenge returned as Second Chance Week, with two eliminated contestants being given the chance to return instead of one.

Contestants

Top 24
The Top 24 contestants were announced on 19–20 April 2021.

Future Appearances

In Series 14 Tommy Pham and Minoli De Silva appeared for another chance to win the title. Minoli was eliminated on 17 May 2022, finishing 18th and Tommy was eliminated on 19 June 2022, finishing 10th.

Guests

Elimination Chart

Episodes and ratings
 Colour key:
  – Highest rating during the series
  – Lowest rating during the series

References

MasterChef Australia
2021 Australian television seasons
Television series impacted by the COVID-19 pandemic